Fingerlings is a live album by Andrew Bird, released in 2002.

Bird on Fingerlings
"This was scraped together from a number of board tapes that just happened to sound good. It starts off with some early solo shows to duo shows with Nora while on tour with The Handsome Family in Europe in 2001. It builds up to a particularly raucous whiskey/adrenaline fueled show at the Hideout with the Bowl of Fire.
"You get a lot of songs that might otherwise never see the light of day. Some of the more questionable subject-matter that I write for my own entertainment and that might threaten to undermine my integrity as a songwriter (smirk). The show in Tilburg, Nora can't even recall as she had a fever of 102'. It all hangs together pretty well, I think".

Track listing

Other appearances

 "Richmond Woman" is a cover of a traditional blues song, "Richland Woman Blues," originally recorded by Mississippi John Hurt,
 "Why?" and "Indiscreet" appeared previously on the album The Swimming Hour.

References

External links
Album information page on artist's official web site

Andrew Bird albums
2002 live albums